The Bahamian passport is issued to citizens of the Bahamas for international travel.

As of March 2019, Bahamian citizens had visa-free or visa on arrival access to 154 countries and territories, ranking the Bahamian passport 26th in terms of travel freedom according to the Henley visa restrictions index.

Passport message 
Passports contain a message, to other countries stating that the bearer of the passport is a citizen of the country, and to provide him or her safe passage. The message reads:

"These are to request and require in the name of the Governor-General of the Commonwealth of the Bahamas all those whom it may concern to allow the bearer to pass freely without let or hindrance and to afford him or her every assistance and protection of which he or she may stand in need."

Appearance 
A regular passport is navy blue, with the Coat of arms of The Bahamas emblazoned on the front cover. The words "COMMONWEALTH OF THE BAHAMAS" and "PASSPORT" along with the international e-passport symbol are below. The passport contains 50 pages for entry/exit stamps and visas. Additionally, the biodata page is made of polycarbonate.

Data page 

 Type (PA)
 Country code (BHS) 
 Passport No. 
Photo of the holder
 Surname
 Given Names
 Nationality (Bahamian)
 Date of Birth
 Sex 
 Place of Birth
 National Insurance Number
 Date of issuance
 Date of expiry
 Place of Issue

The information ends with the Machine Readable Zone beginning in PABHS.

See also
 Visa requirements for Bahamian citizens
 Caribbean passport
List of passports

References

External links 
Bahamian passport requirements

Bahamas
Government of the Bahamas